Ron Leibman (October 11, 1937 – December 6, 2019) was an American actor. He won both the Tony Award for Best Actor in a Play and the Drama Desk Award for Outstanding Actor in a Play in 1993 for his performance as Roy Cohn in Angels in America. Leibman also won a Primetime Emmy Award in 1979 for his role as Martin 'Kaz' Kazinsky in his short-lived crime drama series Kaz.

Leibman also acted in films such as Where's Poppa? (1970), The Hot Rock (1972), Norma Rae (1979), and Zorro, The Gay Blade (1982). Later in his career, he became widely known for providing the voice of Ron Cadillac in Archer (2013–2021) and for playing Dr. Leonard Green, Rachel's rich, short-tempered father, on the sitcom Friends (1996–2004).

Early life
Leibman was born in Manhattan to Grace (née Marks), who was of Russian-Jewish descent, and Murray Leibman, a Russian Jewish immigrant who worked in the garment business. Leibman graduated from Ohio Wesleyan University.

Career
Leibman was a member of the Compass Players in the late 1950s, and was admitted to the Actors Studio shortly thereafter.

Leibman made his film debut alongside George Segal in the dark comedy Where's Poppa? (1970). He then starred alongside Robert Redford and Segal in the heist film The Hot Rock (1972) and he was featured as a northern Jewish union organizer in the award-winning movie Norma Rae (1979). In 1980, he appeared in Up The Academy, a "gross-out" comedy set at a reform school; the film was so poorly received that it was disowned by both the staff of Mad magazine (who produced the movie) and Leibman himself. (Despite playing the leading role, the actor had his name completely removed from the credits and promotional material.)

His other film appearances include Slaughterhouse-Five (1972), Your Three Minutes Are Up (1973) with Beau Bridges and Janet Margolin, Zorro, The Gay Blade (1981), Auto Focus (2002) and Garden State (2004).

Leibman won an Emmy Award, Outstanding Lead Actor In A Drama Series, in 1979 for his convict-turned-lawyer character in Kaz (1978–79), a series which he also created and co-wrote. He was later nominated for a Golden Globe for Best Supporting Actor for the role of Morris Huffner in Christmas Eve.

He co-starred with his second wife, Jessica Walter, in Tartuffe at the Los Angeles Theatre Center in 1986, and they co-starred again in Neil Simon's play Rumors in 1988 on Broadway. They also appeared together as husband and wife in the film Dummy (2003) and in the TV series Law & Order in the episode "House Counsel" in 1995.

Leibman received a 1993 Tony Award for his performance as Roy Cohn in the Pulitzer Prize-winning play Angels in America.

He played Dr. Leonard Green, Rachel Green's overbearing father, on the sitcom Friends. He had a recurring role on The Sopranos as Dr. Plepler. In 1983, Leibman starred in the Australian movie Phar Lap as David J. Davis, the owner of legendary New Zealand/Australian racehorse Phar Lap, which won the 1930 Melbourne Cup and the 1932 Agua Caliente Handicap.

In 2013, Leibman began appearing as a recurring character on the TV series Archer as Ron Cadillac, the husband to Malory Archer, voiced by his real-life wife Jessica Walter.

Personal life
Leibman was married twice. His first wife was actress Linda Lavin, to whom he was married from 1969 to 1981. In 1983, he married actress Jessica Walter.

Death
Leibman died from complications of pneumonia in Manhattan on December 6, 2019, at age 82.

Filmography

Film

Television

Stage

References

External links
 
 Ron Leibman at the University of Wisconsin's Actors Studio audio collection
The New School for Drama

1937 births
2019 deaths
Male actors from New York City
20th-century American male actors
21st-century American male actors
American male film actors
American male stage actors
American male television actors
American male voice actors
American people of Russian-Jewish descent
Drama Desk Award winners
Deaths from pneumonia in New York City
Jewish American male actors
Obie Award recipients
Ohio Wesleyan University alumni
Outstanding Performance by a Lead Actor in a Drama Series Primetime Emmy Award winners
People from Manhattan
The New School faculty
Tony Award winners
21st-century American Jews